Nosherwan Khan (born 11 June 1994 in Peshawar) is a Pakistani professional squash player. As of March 2018, he was ranked number 333 in the world. He has competed in the main draw of multiple professional PSA tournaments.

References

1994 births
Living people
Pakistani male squash players